Cerium iodide may refer to:

 Cerium diiodide, CeI2
 Cerium(III) iodide (Cerium triiodide), CeI3